(born September 3, 1993, Tochigi Prefecture, Japan) is a Japanese actress affiliated with Very Berry Production.

Career

In the early 2000s, Koike auditioned for Hello! Project Kids but did not pass the audition. Koike started a junior idol career with the DVD Big Brother at age 10, when she was in 4th grade. She played Sailor Luna in the 2004 live-action version of Sailor Moon, Pretty Guardian Sailor Moon. She also played the role of Shizuka on the 2008 Kamen Rider Series, Kamen Rider Kiva. In early 2011 she starred in the short TV drama Onegai Kanaete Versailles (おねがいかなえてヴェルサイユ "Fulfill My Wish Versailles"), alongside visual kei metal band Versailles.

After graduating from Asia University in 2016, Koike took a two-year break from the entertainment industry to spend time studying English in New Zealand and Australia.

Filmography

Movies

TV Dramas

Publications

Photobooks
 2006: Tenshinranman  
 2006: Ichinen shi-kumi jū kyū-ban 
 2007: Rina biyori 
 2008: Rina no tabi  (Making with DVD)
 2009: Rina-iro 4 〜 seasons 〜 
 2009: sabrina 
 2009: Sono manma.   (Making with DVD)
 2009: Koike Rina no subete misemasu! 
 2010: BOMB tokubetsu henshū DVD-tsuki mukku `Koike Rina to Kobayashi shōjo complete file'  
 2010: 17-Sai 
 2012: Sotsugyō  
 2012: Mubobi.

DVDs
 2004: Onii-chan to Issho
 2006: Rina. Tanjō shite kara 12-nen
 2006: Rina sagashi tsuā go shōtai
 2007: Rina wa honjitsu ten'nen nari
 2008: Ri nattsu ☆
 2008: Kamen Rider Kiva: King of the Castle in the Demon World (Nomura Shizuka role)
 2008: Kētai shōjo ~ koi no kagai jugyō ~ Vol. 1 ~ Vol. 6 (Fujimiya Momoka role)
 2009: Rina-shiki 4 ~ seasons ~
 2009: Fushigi shōjo katō urara (Kato Urara role)
 2009: Bikkuri na!
 2010: Koike Rina@san Daime Akechi Kogorou-Kobayashi Shoujo No Jikenbo- (Kobayashi girl role)
 2011: Koike Rina RINAism ♪ ~ Rina-teki shinka-ron ~
 2012: JD RINA 3
 2012: Ri na~tsu moto.

References

External links
Official blog
Official profile at Very Berry Production

1993 births
Japanese child actresses
Living people
Models from Tochigi Prefecture
21st-century Japanese actresses
Japanese idols
Actors from Tochigi Prefecture